Ashapurna Devi railway station is a railway station on the Tamluk–Digha branch line of South Eastern Railway zone of Indian Railways. The railway station is situated beside Chawlkhola-Mandarmani Road, Jinandipur in Purba Medinipur district in the Indian state of West Bengal. This station is named after notable Bengali novelist Ashapoorna Devi.

History
The Tamluk–Digha line was sanctioned in 1984–85 Railway Budget at an estimated cost of around Rs 74 crore. Finally this line was opened in 2004. This track including Ashapunra Devi railway station was electrified in 2012–13.

References

Railway stations in Purba Medinipur district
Kharagpur railway division
Kolkata Suburban Railway stations